The Finlandia Trophy is a senior-level international figure skating competition. Since 1995, it is held annually in Finland in Greater Helsinki region, including Helsinki, Vantaa, and Espoo. It became part of the ISU Challenger Series in the 2014–15 season. Medals may be awarded in the disciplines of men's singles, ladies' singles, pair skating, ice dancing, and synchronized skating, although not every discipline is included every year.

Medalists
CS: ISU Challenger Series

Men

Ladies

Pairs

Ice dancing

Synchronized skating

References

External links
 Official website of the Finlandia Trophy
 Previous website

 
ISU Challenger Series
International figure skating competitions hosted by Finland